Ricardo Talu (born 21 July 1993) is a footballer who plays as a centre back for KHC in the Eerste Klasse.

Talu has previously played for Zwolle, Telstar and Scottish side Albion Rovers.

Career
As a youth, Yalu played for Dutch clubs Swift ’64 and Zwolle, before playing senior football with the Bluefingers as well as Telstar.

In July 2015, Talu along with Romario Sabajo went go on trial at Scottish Championship side Greenock Morton with only Sabajo being offered a contract. After leaving Morton, Talu signed up with Coatbridge side Albion Rovers. He played in over 20 matches for Rovers, before leaving the club at the end of the 2015–16 season after his contract expired.

After his release from the Coatbridge side, Talu returned to the Netherlands to sign with lower-league side Dronten in his adopted home town of Dronten. In March 2019, he moved to KHC in the Eerste Klasse.

External links
 Voetbal International profile

References

1993 births
Living people
Dutch footballers
PEC Zwolle players
SC Telstar players
Albion Rovers F.C. players
Eredivisie players
Angolan footballers
Footballers from Luanda
Association football defenders
Scottish Professional Football League players
Angolan expatriate sportspeople in the Netherlands
Angolan expatriate sportspeople in Scotland
Expatriate footballers in Scotland
Expatriate footballers in the Netherlands
Footballers from Dronten